Syed Mahmood Khundmiri (known popularly by his takhallus Talib) was an Indian Urdu language poet, humorist, architect, artist, orator, and one of the leading Urdu poets of the 20th and 21st centuries. He concentrated on humorous poetry, and was considered among the elite of Urdu humor.  He died of cardiac arrest on 16 January 2011, in Pune, Maharashtra, India) 

Khundmiri was born 14 February 1938 in Donegal Bidar, Karnataka, India. In addition to his own writing career, he was involved in many organizations. He was one of the senior most member of Zinda Dalaan-E Hyderabad (a grass-roots arts and humor group) and served on its executive board from 1963 to 2011. He also served on the executive board of Shugoofa, an Urdu periodical, for more than 40 years. Talib, a pseudonym given to him by his peers, combined poetry with both sarcasm and humor. Known for his elevated style and tone in the world of Urdu literature, he combined life experiences with his artistic gifts as a versatile poet and architect.

Family

Khundmiri married Syeda Ayesha Khundmiri, and they had six children: Syeda Salma Khundmiri, Syed Zeeshan Khundmiri, Syed Irfan Khundmiri, Syed Faizan Khundmiri, Afreen Suroor Khundmiri , and Syeda Yasmeen Khundmiri.

Early life

Childhood
Khundmiri's grandfather, Syed Miran, was his mentor and the most ardent supporter. Khundmiri spent most of his childhood with his grandfather who was an accomplished home builder. Miran sahab inspired him to become an architect and in 1963 Khundmiri earned his Architectural degree. He recited his first poem about his grandfather when he was 12 years old and upon his grandfather's encouragement started writing poems. He was a talented man just like his grandfather. He participated in many competitions during his school and college days and won many awards.

Education
Khundmiri attended school in Musheerabad where he lived for 16 years before moving to Chanchalguda on 31 May 1963. He was a versatile man and participated in many extra-curricular activities during his academic career. He also played football with his senior school mate, Syed Nayeemuddin, who was a former Captain and a couch of India national football team. He enrolled in the Jawaharlal Nehru Fine Arts and Architecture University in Hyderabad and earned his architecture degree with the License No 35. He was also elected as " FELLOW OF INDIAN INSTITUTE OF ARCHITECTS" on 16 May 1992 by INDIAN INSTITUTE OF ARCHITECTS with the Registered serial No 1716.

Career

Writings
Khundmiri's poetry and writing career started when he was 12 years. In his college days he and his few friends started a magazine and organization called Bazm-E-Urdu and won Basheerunnissa basher memorial ruling trophy. He was a gifted writer and a poet. He has written many articles in Munsif Urdu daily newspaper weekly column called Turfa tamasha. He has also written a book called Sukhan Ke Parde Mein and now this book is used as a curriculum in Shimoga university of Karnataka. When Khundmiri was seventeen, one of his close relatives, Alam Khundmiri, (an important intellectual figure and a dynamic writer of his time) anticipated that he would be an amazing poet and a writer in the future.

Khatmalon ki faryaad is one of his famous Nazms which was translated in English. The verses are as follows:

Poetry

Classical poetry, at that time was entirely in Persian. Eager to learn Persian, Khundmiri assisted with household chores for an elderly Persian teacher in return for lessons. Many of his poems were published in newspapers of Hyderabad such as Munsif, Saisat, Deccan Chronicle and Times of India. In the 1970s and 80s, he was also invited in many Urdu mushairas and Sham-e-qhazals on

Doordarshan. As he grew older, Khundmiri started participating in Urdu poetry competitions and forums and quickly rose to be one of the most acclaimed poets of Zinda Dalaan-E Hyderabad. Many celebrities such as Zail Singh, Dileep Kumar, Ajit Kumar, Kaifi Azmi and many other celebrities have attended his Mushairas.

As a poet, Khundmiri was recognized on the international level, attending and receiving recognition at several mushairas.

He was also one of the eminent participants and general secretary of World Humor Conference held in February 1985 at Lal Bahadur stadium, Hyderabad. His poetry has been compared to that of the legendary poet, Mirza Ghalib.

Architect
Khundmiri began his career as an architect in BHEL from 1964 to 1976. He started his own firm called S.M Associates at King Kothi, Hyderabad in 1976 and designed over 500 masjids around the world. Since he was a modest and genuine man he never showed off his work.  He never profited from his designs as he considered this to be religious philanthropy. He never advertised his work or put any kind of holding with his name on it, on any project. Apart from religious designs, he designed high rises, commercial buildings, hospitals and family homes. His architectural marvels have been compared to that of Mimar Sinan.

Artist

His artistic talent combined architectural abilities with his ability to connect with people thru his poetry. He has made hundreds of paintings and calligraphies thru his life. Many of his artworks were bought by Muslim families when they were exhibited in Chicago.  
He also designed many title covers for books for other writers. Parvez Yadullah Mehdi's book cover page is one of the example of his design.

Tribute

The Standing Committee of the Greater Hyderabad Municipal Corporation has approved the proposal submitted by Malakpet MLA Ahmed Bin Abdullah Balala, of renaming the Chanchalguda-Malakpet road as "Talib Khundmiri road" to give him a tribute. Hz. Talib Khundmiri Sahab touched many in a positive way through his poetry, calligraphy and his architecture. With humor he brought us together and through his designs allowed us to experience art and culture.

See also

 List of Urdu poets
 Chanchalguda
 Kaifi Azmi
 Urdu literature
 Urdu poetry
 List of Indian poets
 List of poets

Articles on Talib Khundmiri

 Talib Khundmiri: Humorous poet Talib Khundmiri passes away - Wajid, The Saisat Urdu News paper, Monday, 17 Jan 2011.
 Talib Khundmiri: A tribute paid to Talib Khundmiri - By Dr Mujahid Ghazi, Pakistan Link, Chicago, Monday, Jan 17 2011.

References

External links

Urdu-language poets
1938 births
2011 deaths
People from Bidar
20th-century poets